Mahla Momenzadeh (born 15 September 2002 in Karaj) is an Iranian Taekwondo athlete. She won a silver medal in the Taekwondo -46 kg weight class at the 2019 World Taekwondo Championships in Manchester.

References

2002 births
Living people
People from Karaj
Iranian female taekwondo practitioners
Taekwondo practitioners at the 2018 Summer Youth Olympics
World Taekwondo Championships medalists
21st-century Iranian women